The 2012 NASCAR Sprint All-Star Race was a NASCAR Sprint Cup Series stock car race held on May 19, 2012, at Charlotte Motor Speedway in Concord, North Carolina. Contested over 90 laps, the it was the second exhibition race of the 2012 Sprint Cup Series season. Jimmie Johnson of Hendrick Motorsports took his third All-Star Race victory, while Brad Keselowski finished second and Matt Kenseth finished third.

Report

Background

Charlotte Motor Speedway is one of ten intermediate to hold NASCAR races, the others are Atlanta Motor Speedway, Kansas Speedway, Chicagoland Speedway, Darlington Raceway, Homestead Miami Speedway, New Hampshire Motor Speedway, Kentucky Speedway, Las Vegas Motor Speedway, and Texas Motor Speedway. The track's turns are banked at twenty-four degrees, while the front stretch, the location of the finish line, is five degrees. The back stretch, opposite of the front, also had a five degree banking.

A total of 22 drivers were entered for the Sprint Showdown, while 21 different drivers were eligible to participate in the All-Star Race, including race winners from last season through the 2012 Bojangles' Southern 500 at Darlington Raceway and previous All-Star race winners from the past 10 years. The drivers who finish first and second in the Sprint Showdown, a 40-lap  preliminary race, was also eligible to compete in the race, as well as the Sprint fan vote winner. The race was 90 laps long, separated into five segments: four segments of 20 laps and a final segment of 10 laps. A mandatory pit stop was between the final two segments, while pitting between the 20 lap segments was optional. Each segment winner moved to the front of the grid before the pit stops, but drivers lined-up for the restart how they left pit road. Since the inaugural race in 1985, the format has changed eight times.

Pit crew challenge

The top-24 pit crews chose their pit stall by how they finished in the Sprint Pit Crew Challenge on May 17, 2012. The winner of the event was the No. 48 team from Hendrick Motorsports, which is driven on track by Jimmie Johnson. They beat the No. 11 team from Joe Gibbs Racing, driven on track by Denny Hamlin, by 0.294 seconds. Following the challenge, Johnson stated, "In this discipline, the athleticism and training really pays off. We made a big effort to get full-fledged athletes who did nothing but work on their pit stops and disciplines. And then they focused on this — the distance to run, the car push and all that — and I think it just shows how strong they are, how physically able they are to get the job done."

In addition, the event had individual winners who were the best in each category: jack man, gas man, front tire changers, and rear tire changers with the addition of two tire carriers. The jack man competition was won by Jeff Keer, from Kasey Kahne's Hendrick Motorsports' No. 5 team, while the gas man competition was won by Tom Lampe, who was from Kyle Busch's Joe Gibbs Racing No. 18 team. Jeff Burton's Richard Childress Racing No. 31 team's front tire changer, Tim Sheets, and tire carrier JD Holcomb, who performed a record time of 13.615 seconds. The rear tire changer and tire carrier competition was won be Jake Seminara and Kenny Barber from the No. 18 Joe Gibbs Racing team.

Practice and qualifying

Two practice sessions were held on May 18, 2012; one for both the Sprint Showdown and the other for the All-Star Race. The Sprint Showdown practice was 85 minutes, while the All-Star Race practice session lasted 145 minutes. Qualifying for both events were held following the practice sessions.

During the Sprint Showdown practice session, Dale Earnhardt Jr. was quickest with a time of 28.706 seconds, eight one-thousandths of a second faster than A. J. Allmendinger in the second position. Landon Cassill followed in third, ahead of Bobby Labonte, Martin Truex Jr. and Burton. Casey Mears was scored seventh fastest, while Aric Almirola, Travis Kvapil and Juan Pablo Montoya completed the first ten positions. Kyle Busch was quickest in the All-Star Race practice session with a time of 28.672. Greg Biffle followed Kyle Busch in the second position by 0.095 seconds. Marcos Ambrose was third quickest, ahead of Carl Edwards, Kevin Harvick and Brad Keselowski. Mark Martin was scored seventh fastest with a time of 28.986, 0.314 behind Kyle Busch. Matt Kenseth, Paul Menard and Kurt Busch completed the first ten drivers in the session.

Allmendinger clinched the Sprint Showdown pole position a time of 28.057 seconds. Truex Jr. qualified 0.208 seconds behind and will Allmendinger on the front row of the grid. Earnhardt Jr. took third place, ahead of Burton and Almirola in the fourth and fifth positions. Cassill qualified sixth, while Montoya followed in seventh. Labonte, Kvapil and David Stremme completed the first ten positions.

Unlike the two-lap qualifying sessions in the season, the Sprint All-Star Race qualifying session consists of three laps and four-tire pit stop, which is during the second lap. Kyle Busch won the pole position for the All-Star Race with a time of 1:59.112 for the three laps with pit stop. Ryan Newman qualified second, ahead of Hamlin, Biffle, and Harvick. Johnson, with a time of 2:01.076, was seventh quickest, less than one-tenth of a second quicker than Menard in eighth. Jeff Gordon, Tony Stewart and Regan Smith completed the first ten positions of the grid. Also in the All-Star Race qualifying session, Kasey Kahne collided into the fourth turn wall while trying to finish his qualifying attempt, forcing him to change to a back-up car. "We unloaded with a really fast race car [Friday]," Busch commented after the session, "The guys made some minor changes to it to kind of feel it out and make it better where we could. The guys did a great job there with the pit stop, coming down pit road and changing four [tires] and then getting back out there and coming back to the line pretty quick."

Sprint Showdown
A. J. Allmendinger won the pole for the Sprint Showdown, but would have to go to pit road during the pace laps to change a flat tire. Dale Earnhardt Jr. dominated the showdown leading every lap to cruise to victory. A.J Allmendinger would finish second in the final transfer spot after a hard battle with Jamie McMurray.

NASCAR Sprint All-Star Race
The 2012 NASCAR Sprint All-Star race was the second exhibition race of the season, and was televised live in the United States on Speed, which began at 7:30 p.m. local time. Joe Gibbs, owner of Joe Gibbs Racing, began pre-race ceremonies with an invocation. Singer Tony Lucca, finalist on the singing talent show The Voice, performed the national anthem, and Sprint customer Travis Rosia commanded the drivers to start their engines.

Results

Showdown and All-Star Race qualifying

Showdown results

References

NASCAR races at Charlotte Motor Speedway
All-Star Race
NASCAR Sprint All-Star Race
NASCAR Sprint All-Star Race
NASCAR All-Star Race